Corynesporina is a genus of fungi of unknown placement within Ascomycota.

References

External links 

 

Ascomycota genera
Ascomycota enigmatic taxa
Taxa described in 1994